Alex Riley is an American attorney and politician serving as a member of the Missouri House of Representatives from the 134th district. Elected in November 2020, he assumed office on January 6, 2021.

Early life and education 
Riley was born and raised in Springfield, Missouri. He earned a Bachelor of Arts degree in political science from Thomas Edison State University, a paralegal certificate from Purdue University, and a Juris Doctor from the Southern Illinois University School of Law.

Career 
Riley began his career as a paralegal for Turner, Reid, Duncan, Loomer & Patton, P.C. He later worked as an associate attorney at the Malkmus Law Firm. Since January 2019, he has worked as an associate at McAfee & Taft. Riley was elected to the Missouri House of Representatives in November 2020 and assumed office on January 6, 2021. Riley also serves as vice chair of the Joint Committee on Administrative Rules and vice chair of the House General Laws Committee.

References 

Living people
People from Springfield, Missouri
American lawyers
Missouri lawyers
Thomas Edison State University alumni
Southern Illinois University School of Law alumni
Republican Party members of the Missouri House of Representatives
Year of birth missing (living people)